British Rail 18100 was a prototype main line gas turbine-electric locomotive built for British Railways in 1951 by Metropolitan-Vickers, Manchester. It had, however, been ordered by the Great Western Railway in the 1940s, but construction was delayed due to World War II. It spent its working life on the Western Region of British Railways, operating express passenger services from Paddington station, London.

Overview
It was painted in BR black livery, with a silver stripe around the middle of the body and silver numbers.

Technical details
The gas turbine was of a type which would now be called a turboshaft engine but it differed from modern free-turbine turboshaft engines in having only one turbine to drive both the compressor and the output shaft.  It was based on aircraft practice and had six horizontal combustion chambers (spaced radially around the turbine shaft) and no heat exchanger.  

The emphasis was on power, rather than economy, and the fuel consumption was high.  It was designed to use aviation kerosene and was much more expensive to run than No. 18000, which used heavy fuel oil.  The turbine drove, through reduction gearing:
 three main generators
 one auxiliary generator for battery charging
 one exciter for the main generators

Each main generator powered two traction motors.  Unlike No. 18000, there was no auxiliary diesel engine and the turbine was started by battery power, using the main generators as starter motors.

Comparison of 18000 and 18100

The following table gives a comparison between 18000 and 18100.  There are some anomalies and these are described in the notes.

Notes:
 In 18000, output horsepower is 24% of total horsepower and in 18100, output horsepower is 33% of total horsepower.  This suggests that 18100 had the higher thermal efficiency but, in practice, 18000 had the higher thermal efficiency.  The horsepower figures should, therefore, be regarded with some scepticism.
 Where electric transmission is used, the horsepower of the traction motors is usually 81% (i.e. 90% x 90%) that of the prime mover.  The figure for 18100 is therefore about right but the figure for 18000 looks anomalous.

Conversion

In early 1958 it was withdrawn from operation and was stored at Swindon Works for a short period before it was returned to Metropolitan Vickers for conversion as a prototype 25 kV AC electric locomotive.  As an electric locomotive, it was numbered E1000 (E2001 from 1959) and was given the TOPS classification of class 80.

See also
 British Rail 18000
 British Rail GT3
 British Rail APT-E

Models 
18100 is being made as a kit and ready-to-run in OO gauge by Silver Fox Models.

References

Sources

 Sampson, H. (editor), The Dumpy Book of Railways of the World,  published by Sampson Low, London, date circa 1960
 Robertson, K. (1989). The Great Western Railway Gas Turbines, published by Alan Sutton,

Further reading

External links
  Rail Photo Archive - 18100
Photo of 18100 under construction
 "Turbine Speeds British Trains" Popular Science, April 1952, p. 131, mid-page

British Railways gas turbine locomotives
Metropolitan-Vickers locomotives
Co-Co locomotives
Experimental locomotives
Individual locomotives of Great Britain
Railway locomotives introduced in 1951
Standard gauge locomotives of Great Britain
Unique locomotives
Scrapped locomotives